Prof. Datuk Ir. Dr. Wahid bin Omar (born 27 May 1962) is a Malaysian lecturer in structural engineering who served as the 6th Vice-Chancellor of University of Technology Malaysia from 2013 until 2020.

Early life and education

He obtained his Diploma in Engineering (DipEng) (Civil Engineering) from University of Technology Malaysia in 1983, Bachelor of Science (BSc) (Civil Engineering) from the University of Strathclyde, Master of Science (MSc) (Bridge Engineering) from the University of Surrey and Doctor of Philosophy (PhD) (Structural Engineering) from the University of Birmingham.

Career

Prior to his current appointment, he was the Deputy Vice-Chancellor (Development) (2011-2013) and Director, Office of Asset and Development (2008-2011) who was instrumental in managing major development projects of the university. His expertise includes structural assessment, reinforced and pre-stressed concrete, with his latest research endeavour being an investigation on innovative techniques in improving the ductility of high strength concrete. His biggest interest lies in project management and sustainability, and is strongly committed to his vision in transforming UTM into a sustainable campus.

Honours

Honours of Malaysia

 :
  Commander of the Order of Meritorious Service (PJN) – Datuk (2014)
 :
  Knight Companion of the Esteemed Order of the Crown of Pahang (DIMP) – Dato' (1996)
 Grand Knight of the Order of Sultan Ahmad Shah of Pahang (SSAP) – Dato' Sri (2006)

References

External links
UTM VC official website

University of Technology Malaysia alumni
Alumni of the University of Birmingham
Alumni of the University of Surrey
Alumni of the University of Strathclyde
Place of birth missing (living people)
Living people
1962 births
Academic staff of the University of Technology Malaysia